Glyptothorax caudimaculatus is a species of catfish that was first described by Anganthoibi and Vishwanath 2011. Glyptothorax caudimaculatus is a species in genus Glyptothorax, family Sisoridae and order Siluriformes. No subspecies are listed in Catalogue of Life. It is found in the Kaladan River basin in Mizoram State, India.

References 

Glyptothorax
Taxa named by Nongmaithem Anganthoibi
Taxa named by Waikhom Vishwanath
Fish described in 2011